Shamekh Bluwi is a Saudi illustrator and fashion designer. He gained worldwide popularity after his published sketches went viral on the Internet. In sketches, the women's dresses' design-line was cut-out so that the background would form texture for the dress. He composed most of this art in his hometown Amman as the background.

References

People from Amman
Year of birth missing (living people)
Living people
Jordanian artists